Pejčinović is a Serbo-Croatian surname, a patronymic derived from Pejčin, itself a patronymic of Pejo, a diminutive of Petar (Peter).

Notable people with the name include:
Davor Pejčinović (born 1971), retired Croatian basketballer
Nemanja Pejčinović (born 1987), Serbian footballer

Croatian surnames
Serbian surnames
Slavic-language surnames
Patronymic surnames